Jeanne Millerand (May 7, 1864 – October 23, 1950) was the wife of the President of France Alexandre Millerand.

Jeanne Millerand was admired for her representational qualities. She was old fashioned and conventional; she forbade her children from listening to modern music, and despite the new fashion of the 1920s, she continued to dress in older fashions, in a corset, long skirts, and big hats.

References

Bertrand Meyer-Stabley, Les Dames de l'Élysée. Celles d'hier et de demain, Librairie Académique Perrin, Paris.

1864 births
1950 deaths
Spouses of French presidents
Spouses of prime ministers of France